Philippe Leroux (born 24 September 1959) is a French composer living in Montreal, Quebec, who has been identified as "one of the most important composers in contemporary music."

Biography 
Leroux was born in Boulogne-Billancourt. He studied composition starting in 1978 with Ivo Malec, Claude Ballif, Pierre Schaeffer, and Guy Rebeil at the Paris Conservatoire National Supérieur de Musique, where he obtained three first prizes. He studied at both the Groupe de Recherches Musicales and at IRCAM during this period. He was selected for a residency at the French Academy in Rome from 1993-1995.

From 2001-2006 he was a composition teacher at IRCAM, in the Cursus d’Informatique Musicale programme. Since 2011 he has been an associate professor in composition at the Schulich School of Music, McGill University.

Selected works 
 (D)Tourner (2016/17) for solo percussion and 10 instruments
 Envers IV (2016) for symphony orchestra
 Postlude à l'Épais (2016) for flute, clarinet, violin, cello and piano
 De l'imitation (2015) for saxophone quartet and electronics
 White face (2015) for string quartet
 Nomadic Sounds (2015) for a capella choir
 Quid sit musicus (2013/14) for 4 voices, guitar, cello, and electronics
 Total SOLo (2013) for 28 instruments
 Ailes (2012) for baritone and 15 instruments
 De l'itération (2012) for 6 percussionists
 ...Ami...chemin...oser...vie... (2011) for 15 instruments
 Extended Apocalypsis (2011) for 4 voices, 16 instruments, electronics, and video ad libitum.
 Envers Symphonie (2010) for symphony orchestra
 Pourquoi? (2009) for 4 voices and orchestra
 Objets trouvés ...posés (2009) acousmatic
 AMA (2009) for solo piano
 L’unique trait de pinceau (2008/9) for saxophone and symphony orchestra
 De la texture (2007) for 8 instruments
 Pour que les êtres ne soient pas traités comme des marchandises (2004) for 12 mixed voices, orchestra, and ad libitum electronics
 m'M (2003) concerto grosso for symphony orchestra
 Du souffle (2003) for saxophone quartet
 Airs (2003) for saxophone and percussion
 Voi(Rex) (2002) for voice, 6 instruments, and electronics
 Les Uns (2001) for 3 percussionists
 De la Vitesse (2001) for 6 percussionists
 SPP (2000) for soprano saxophone and piano
 Plus loin (1999-2000) for symphony orchestra
 M.É. (1998) acousmatic
 M (1997) for 2 pianos, 2 percussion and electronics
 AAA (1996) for 7 instruments
 Souffles (1996) for wind quintet
 (d')Aller (1995) for solo violin and 16 instruments
 Continuo(ns) (1994) for quintet
 PPP (1993) for flute and piano
 AIR (1993) for Bb clarinet and percussion
 AIR-RÉ (1992) for violin and percussion
 Je brûle, dit-elle un jour à un camarade (1990) for voice

References

External links 
 His web site
 Page on Gérard Billaudot Éditeur (publisher)

1959 births
Living people
20th-century classical composers
Conservatoire de Paris alumni
French classical composers
French male classical composers
French male composers
20th-century French composers
20th-century French male musicians